Emilio Mario Renner Osmeña Jr. (September 11, 1938 – July 19, 2021), better known as Lito Osmeña, was the grandson of Philippine President Sergio Osmeña. He was the Governor of Cebu, Philippines from 1988 to 1992. He was the founder and chairman of the PROMDI Party (Progressive Movement for the Devolution of Initiatives), under which he ran for the position of President in the 1998 election but lost to Joseph Estrada. He also ran for the position of Vice President and was the running-mate of Fidel Ramos in the 1992 election, but lost to Joseph Estrada, six years before Estrada would defeat him again.

Early life and career
Osmeña was born on September 11, 1938, in Cebu City, Cebu to Dr. Emilio V. Osmeña and Ma. Luisa Renner. He graduated with a degree of Bachelor of Science in Business Administration at the University of San Carlos, Cebu. Early in life, Lito managed Hacienda Lugo. He developed Maria Luisa Estate Park, a family owned residential subdivision.

In the 1970s, he was a political prisoner during Martial Law in 1973 at Fort Bonifacio for nine months and placed under house arrest for four years. During the late 1970s, he focused on developing real estate projects. It was not until the assassination of Ninoy Aquino that he got involved in politics and ran for governor in 1988.

Governor of Cebu
Osmeña served as the Governor of Cebu from February 2, 1988, to June 30, 1992.

Economic reforms

After the reorganization of local governments and the ratification of the 1987 Constitution, he ran for the position of Governor for the province of Cebu in 1988 and won. During his term as Governor of Cebu, Osmeña was able to increase the provincial budget to 1 billion pesos per annum. He made possible the construction of flyovers and causeways, and purchased heavy equipment that caused the opening and maintenance of several barangay roads and bridges as well as the farm-to-market roads and began construction of the Trans Central Highway, connecting Cebu City to the West. Osmeña launched a Water Distribution Program in the entire island, making water available to 90% of the population, as opposed to the 56% before his incumbency. He set up the municipal telephone system throughout the province. Osmeña initiated the modernization of Cebu's International Airport. He also worked with Fr. Francisco G. Silva in developing "Rural Electrification" for remote areas of the province. He also initiated direct flights from Cebu to the different parts of the world. He was elected as Chairman of the League of Governors of the Philippines from 1990 to 1992. It was during his watch as Governor of Cebu that Cebu experienced an economic boom.

1992 vice presidential election

After Fidel V. Ramos bolted the Laban ng Demokratikong Pilipino in 1992, he invited Osmeña to his new party Lakas Tao (later Lakas-NUCD) and offered to be his running mate in the May 11 elections. Osmeña accepted Ramos' invitation and accepted his offer citing his vision to follow his grandfather's footsteps. He however lost to Joseph Estrada in a 7-way race for Vice President.

Post-governorship

Chief economic adviser
Osmeña served as Executive Vice President of Lakas-NUCD and Chief Economic Adviser of President Fidel V. Ramos from 1993 to 1997. He also Chaired the Presidential Committee on Flagship Programs and Projects and finished or substantially undertook the following projects: The General Santos Airport, the Mactan Cebu International Airport, the upgrading of the Batangas port, the upgrading of the General Santos Seaport, the Rehabilitation of the Pan-Philippine Highway, the Quirino Highway, the Southern Tagalog Arterial Highway (Sto. Tomas-Lipa Section), C-5 Road (from South Luzon Expressway to Katipunan Avenue), the Metro Manila Skyway (Buendia to Bicutan), the Edsa/Boni underpass, the Kalayaan/EDSA flyover, the Ayala-Pasay Road interchange, the EDSA-Shaw flyover, the Bohol Circumferential Road, the Bataan Combined Cycle Power Plant (600MW), the Palimpinon Geothermal Plant (80MW), the Pagbilao Plant (700MW), the Upper Mahiao & Malitbog Geothermal Plant in Leyte (231MW), the Rehabilitation of PNR South Line, Line 2, Line 3 and the Deregulation of the Telecom Sector.

1998 presidential election

In 1997, he bolted from Lakas-NUCD and formed his own party he called PROMDI Party (Probinsya Muna Development Initiative). With Ismael Sueño as his running mate, he ran for the position of President in the 11-way presidential election but lost to Joseph Estrada.

Later activities
Osmeña returned to private life after the elections handling the party he founded as a party-list party. In the House of Representatives, the party was represented by Joy Augustus Young. Osmeña did not run in the 2004 elections and supported his former political rival Raul Roco for president. His party was disqualified in the party list elections, citing that the party was a national political party.

Osmeña ran in 2010 for senator but lost.

Personal life
Lito, as he was often called, was married to Annette Versoza and had three children, namely Mariano, Maria Luisa, and Emilio III. He had eight grand children – Annette, Santino, Marie, Katrien, Alexander, Emilio IV, Illeana, and Julia. Lito was part of the Osmeña clan, a very influential political family in the Philippines.  Other prominent family members include Former Senators Sergio Osmeña III, John Henry Osmeña and Sergio Osmeña Jr.; former Cebu City Mayor Tomas Osmeña, former President Sergio Osmeña, former Cebu Vice Governor John Gregory Osmeña,  as well as his sister, real estate developer Annabelle "Annie" Osmeña-Aboitiz.

Death
Osmeña died on July 19, 2021, in his hometown of Cebu City from COVID-19. He was 82 years old. His wife Annette also died from complications of the virus two weeks later, on July 31.

References

External links
Philippine Daily Inquirer: Three parties seal alliance

1938 births
2021 deaths
Governors of Cebu
Advisers to the President of the Philippines
Candidates in the 1998 Philippine presidential election
Candidates in the 1992 Philippine vice-presidential election
People from Cebu City
Emilio
Lakas–CMD (1991) politicians
Probinsya Muna Development Initiative politicians
University of San Carlos alumni
Recipients of the Presidential Medal of Merit (Philippines)
Deaths from the COVID-19 pandemic in the Philippines